Wicks (also referred to as bonks or globs) are a hairstyle originating in South Florida. This hairstyle is prevalent amongst African-Americans, The Hairstyles originated from Afro-Caribbeans (specifically Afro-Haitian) in descent and are involved in the Hip-Hop community as well as related subgenres in Florida.

Methods 
There are three main methods of creating Wicks:

The "crochet needle method" which is the method of using a crochet needle, normally with two or more "fangs" to crochet existing dreadlocks together. This is the best and cleanest method as it leaves the wicks looking clean and healthy.

The "combine method" which is the process of tying existing dreadlocs with rubber bands together allowing the locs to fuse together giving them the infamous upright habit.
The other method is the "freeform method" which is the process of allowing locs to naturally form via the rinse and go method and allowing the locs to naturally lock on to each other.

Etymology 
The term "Wicks" was given to this hairstyle due to the fact each one resembles the wick of a candle because of their upright positioning.

See also
Afro-textured hair
Broward County
Miami-Dade County
African diaspora
African American culture
Demographics of Florida

References 

Hairstyles